Sphaerosporoceros is a genus in the hornwort family Anthocerotaceae.  It includes only two species, both originally published as species of Anthoceros but since transferred to the new genus.

References

External links

Hornworts
Bryophyte genera